On Your Head is a Canadian comedy-drama film, directed by André Melançon and Geneviève Lefebvre and released in 2001. The film stars Arianne Maheu as Simone, a young blind girl living with her single father Marc (Serge Dupire) who is scheming to set him up with a single woman in their town, Céline (Céline Bonnier), so that she can have a new mother.

The cast also includes Marc Messier as Céline's irascible anarchist father Gaby; Daniel Fanego as Diego, an Argentine pilot who is a rival for Céline's affections; David Boutin as Marc's best friend Fred on whom Simone has a schoolgirl crush; and Maka Kotto as Florent, the town's parish priest.

Osvaldo Montes received a Genie Award nomination for Best Original Song at the 22nd Genie Awards, for the song "La niebla del tiempo".

References

External links

 
 
 

2001 films
Canadian comedy-drama films
Films shot in Quebec
Films set in Quebec
Films directed by André Melançon
2000s French-language films
French-language Canadian films
2000s Canadian films